Smart City is a 2006 Indian Malayalam-language action film written and directed by B. Unnikrishnan. The film stars Suresh Gopi, Murali, Jayasurya, Gopika, Lakshmi Gopalaswami, Sanjay Mitra, Manoj K. Jayan and Siddique. This is the debut movie of Unnikrishnan as a director.

Plot
A 10-year-old orphan raises his hand against a police officer who commits an act of injustice. Impressed, Sekharan (Murali), the godfather-like gang leader who cares for the poor, gives him shelter. The boy grows up to be Sekharan's most trusted associate, Madhavan (Suresh Gopi). Sekharan's daughter Sarada (Lakshmi Gopalaswami) is married to Sarath Chandran (Manoj K. Jayan), a town planning officer. A real-estate group, Kottooran Group, in collusion with finance minister Reghuram (Shammi Thilakan), wants to forcibly evict over 6,000 families from the land for a Smart-City-type industrial project. Sekharan is able to foil the plans of the Kottoorans with the help of the Chief Minister (Rajan P. Dev). Thus begins the feud between the Kottoorans and Sekharan. The real brain behind the Kottoorans and the people who remained in the background now comes out into the open.

Cast
Suresh Gopi as Madhavan
Murali as Chandrashekharan
Jayasurya as Varun Nambiyar
Gopika as Devika
Lakshmi Gopalaswamy as Saradha
Sanjay Mitra as Sunil Kotturan
Manoj K. Jayan as Sarath Chandran
Siddique as Commissioner Arun Nambiyar IPS
Shammi Thilakan as Minister Reghuram Vaidhyan
Rajmohan Unnithan as Joseph Kotturan
Rajan P Dev as Chief Minister
Santhosh Jogi as Jose
Subair as Thomas Kotturan
Baburaj as SI Divakaran
Rajesh Hebbar as Joy Philip
T. P. Madhavan as Sathyasheelan
Beena Antony as Saleena
Kunjan as Alphonse

References

External links
 

2006 films
2000s thriller films
2000s Malayalam-language films
Films directed by B. Unnikrishnan